Očkov is a village and municipality in Nové Mesto nad Váhom District in the Trenčín Region of western Slovakia.

History
In historical records the village was first mentioned in 1321.

Geography
The municipality lies at an altitude of 169 metres and covers an area of 4.942 km². It has a population of about 448 people.

References

External links

  Official page
http://www.statistics.sk/mosmis/eng/run.html

Villages and municipalities in Nové Mesto nad Váhom District